The 2009–10 Coppa Italia was the 63rd season of the tournament. The competition started on 2 August 2009 and ended on 5 May 2010. As in the previous year, 78 clubs took part in the tournament. Internazionale were the cup holders.

Participating teams

Lega Calcio

Serie A (20 teams)

Atalanta
Bari
Bologna
Cagliari
Catania
Chievo
Fiorentina
Genoa
Internazionale
Juventus
Lazio
Livorno
Milan
Napoli
Palermo
Parma
Roma
Sampdoria
Siena
Udinese

Serie B (22 teams)

AlbinoLeffe
Ancona
Ascoli
Brescia
Cesena
Cittadella
Crotone
Empoli
Frosinone
Gallipoli
Grosseto
Lecce
Mantova
Modena
Padova
Piacenza
Reggina
Salernitana
Sassuolo
Torino
Triestina
Vicenza

Lega Pro

Prima Divisione (25 teams)

Alessandria
Arezzo
Benevento
Cavese
Como
Cosenza
Cremonese
Figline
Foggia
Giulianova
Lumezzane
Novara
Pergocrema
Perugia
Pescina V.d.G.
Pro Patria
Ravenna
Marcianise
Reggiana
Rimini
SPAL
Taranto
Ternana
Varese
Hellas Verona

Seconda Divisione (6 teams)

Fano
Gela
Nocerina
Prato
Spezia
Vico Equense

Lega Nazionale Dilettanti

Serie D (5 teams)

Renate
Chioggia Sottomarina
Castellarano
Sansepolcro
Viterbese

Seedings and format
Teams entered the cup at various stages, as follows:
 First phase: one-leg fixtures
 First round: 36 Teams from Lega Pro and lower, comprising 25 teams from Lega Pro Prima Divisione (1 team relegated from Serie B 2008-09, 7 promoted teams, and the 17 best Prima Divisione teams not promoted 2008-09), 6 teams from Lega Pro Seconda Divisione (4 promoted from Serie D 2008-09, 2 high finishers in Seconda 2008-09) and 5 teams from Serie D (generally high finishers but not promoted 2008-09);
 Second round: The 18 winners face 22 Serie B teams.
 Third round: The 20 survivors meet Serie A sides seeded 9-20
 Fourth round: The 16 survivors face off.
 Second phase: one-leg fixtures (except semifinal)
 Round of 16: 8 Fourth round winners are inserted into a bracket with seeds 1-8
 Seeds 1-8: Fiorentina, Genoa, Milan, Inter, Juventus, Udinese, Roma, Lazio (cup holders)
 Quarterfinals: 8 last 16 winners.
 Semifinals: Two-leg fixtures with pairings based upon bracket
 Final: one-leg fixture at the Stadio Olimpico in Rome.

Matches

Elimination rounds

Section 1

Match details

First round

Second round

Third round

Fourth round

Section 2

Match details

First round

Second round

Third round

Fourth round

Section 3

Match details

First round

Second round

Third round

Fourth round

Section 4

Match details

First round

Second round

Third round

Fourth round

Section 5

Match details

First round

Second round

Third round

Fourth round

Section 6

Match details

First round

Second round

Third round

Fourth round

Section 7

Match details

First round

Second round

Third round

Fourth round

Section 8

Match details

First round

Second round

Third round

Fourth round

Final stage

Bracket

Round of 16

Quarter-finals

Semi-finals

First leg

Second leg

Internazionale won 2–0 on aggregate.

Roma won 2–1 on aggregate.

Final

This victory was the first of Inter's path to a grande treble which saw them sweep the domestic double in the form of the Coppa Italia, Serie A, and finally be crowned Champions of Europe, for the first time since the days of La Grande Inter, by winning the Champions League.

Top goalscorers

External links
https://web.archive.org/web/20090806092330/http://www.lega-calcio.it/media/CU_2_Allegato.pdf
http://www.lega-calcio.it//it/Tim-Cup/Calendario-e-risultati.page

Coppa Italia seasons
Italy
Coppa Italia